Paramelania iridescens is a species of tropical freshwater snail with an operculum, aquatic gastropod mollusk in the family Paludomidae.

Distribution 
This species is found in Lake Tanganyika in Burundi, also in the Democratic Republic of the Congo, Tanzania, and Zambia.

Shell description 

There is a spine in the upper part and in the lower part of the aperture of mature specimens.

The width of the shell is 19 mm. The height of the shell is 40 mm.

Ecology 
This snail lives in Lake Tanganyika in depths of 10–150 m. It lives on a mud substrate.

References

Further reading 
 Strong E. E. & Glaubrecht M. (2010). "Anatomy of the Tiphobiini from Lake Tanganyika (Cerithioidea, Paludomidae)". Malacologia 52(1): 115-153. .

Paludomidae
Gastropods described in 1898
Taxonomy articles created by Polbot